Nolthenius's long-tailed climbing mouse (Vandeleuria nolthenii), also known as Sri Lanka highland tree mouse or Podi-gas-miya, is a species of rodent in the family Muridae. The species is endemic to the highlands of Sri Lanka. It is a nocturnal arboreal mouse, which is named after A. C. Tutein-Nolthenius, an amateur zoologist who collected the first specimens in 1929.

Description
The body is  – , with a  -  tail. It has dark reddish brown dorsally and is darker on the back. Underparts gray. Dark brown face. Dark brown tail and ears. Long whiskers are black, short ones are silvery in color. Back fur long, soft, and dense.

References

 de A. Goonatilake, W.I.L.D.P.T.S., Nameer, P.O. & Molur, S. 2008.  .   2009 IUCN Red List of Threatened Species.   Downloaded on 6 October 2009.

Vandeleuria
Mammals of Sri Lanka
Mammals described in 1929
Taxonomy articles created by Polbot